Christopher John Monckton (born 23 March 1954 at Ipswich, England), is a conductor, singer, and organ recitalist and accompanist.

The son of an eye surgeon, Monckton was educated at Gresham's School (where he learnt to play the organ), and Magdalen College, Oxford (where he held a choral scholarship and read English). Graduating from Oxford in 1976 he attended a Law School in Guildford, Surrey. A further scholarship in literature and the fine arts took him to a cultural foundation at Vence in France. He became organist of the Basilica of Notre Dame de Nice, taught music at a choir school for boys in Grasse, and studied music at the Nice Conservatoire.

He has performed (as a solo singer, organist, and conductor) in almost every western and central European country. His performances in the British Isles include a song recital at St John's, Smith Square, and St Patrick's Cathedral in Dublin. He is based mainly in France.

Monckton also lectures around the world. In 2005, he formed a travel company, Thomas Martlet Ltd, to organize cultural tours to places of artistic, architectural and musical interest.

References

Christopher Monckton – official site
thomasmartlet.com – official site

1954 births
Living people
Musicians from Ipswich
Alumni of Magdalen College, Oxford
People educated at Gresham's School
English classical organists
British male organists
21st-century organists
21st-century British male musicians
Male classical organists